Elkhart is the name of several places in U.S.A.:

Elkhart, Illinois
Elkhart, Indiana
Elkhart, Iowa
Elkhart, Kansas
Elkhart, Texas
Elkhart County, Indiana
Elkhart Lake, Wisconsin
Elkhart River, Indiana

See also

 An elk hart, is a Hart (deer) that is an Elk
 
 
 Hart (disambiguation)
 Elk (disambiguation)